In , the Portsmouth Spartans appeared in the league championship game, the first playoff game in NFL history, losing to the Chicago Bears 9–0. With a record of 6–1–4 in 1932, the Spartans finished in a tie for the NFL title with the Chicago Bears. It was the first time in history that the season ended with two teams atop the league's standings. (Ties were omitted in calculating winning percentage.) Both games during the season between Portsmouth and Chicago had ended in ties; to determine a sole champion, the league office arranged for the first playoff game in NFL history.

The game was originally scheduled to be played at Wrigley Field, the Bears' home stadium. Due to severe blizzards and sub-zero wind chill throughout the week, the game was moved indoors to Chicago Stadium. The arena allowed only an 80-yard field (end lines) that came right to the walls, and the goal posts were moved from the end lines to the goal. The Bears won 9–0, scoring the winning touchdown on a two-yard pass from Bronko Nagurski to Red Grange in the fourth quarter. Attendance for the game was 11,198.

With the loss, Portsmouth dropped to third in the final league standings, behind the runner-up Green Bay Packers (10–3–1).

Season

Schedule

Standings

Roster

Playoff Game

Chicago Bears 9, Portsmouth Spartans 0

Awards and records

References

External links 
1932 Portsmouth Spartans at Pro Football Reference
1932 Portsmouth Spartans at jt-sw.com
1932 Portsmouth Spatans at The Football Database

External links
Spartans on Pro Football Reference

Portsmouth Spartans
Portsmouth Spartans
Detroit Lions seasons